Ek Sam An (born 16 January 1944) is a Cambodian boxer. He competed in the men's bantamweight event at the 1964 Summer Olympics.

References

External links
 

1944 births
Living people
Cambodian male boxers
Olympic boxers of Cambodia
Boxers at the 1964 Summer Olympics
Place of birth missing (living people)
Bantamweight boxers